Ingvild Kjerkol (born 18 May 1975) is a Norwegian politician for the Labour Party. She was elected to the Parliament of Norway from Nord-Trøndelag first time in 2013, and re-elected in 2017 and 2021. She has been a member of the Standing Committee on Transport and Communications, and of the Standing Committee on Health and Care Services. Since 2021, she has served as minister of health and care services.

Personal life
Kjerkol was born in Stjørdal on 18 May 1975, and is a daughter of psychologist Ole Meier Kjerkol and nurse Bodil Johanne Kjerkol. She studied psychology and informatics at the Norwegian University of Science and Technology and at the Sør-Trøndelag University College. She is married to Rune Øyan, with whom she has three children.

Political career

Local politics
Kjerkol was a member or the municipal council of Stjørdal from 1995 to 2011. She was a member of the Nord-Trøndelag County Municipality from 2003 to 2013, and chaired the county cabinet from 2011 to 2013.

Parliament
She was a deptuty representative to the Storting from the constituency of Nord-Trøndelag for the periods 2005–2009 and 2009–2013, for the Labour Party. She was elected ordinary representative to the Storting in 2013, where she was member of the Standing Committee on Transport and Communications from 2013 to 2015, and the Standing Committee on Health and Care Services from 2015 to 2017. She was also a member of the Election Committee from 2013 to 2017, and of the Preparatory Credentials Committee in 2017. From 2016 to 2017 she was a delegate to the United Nations General Assembly.

She was re-elected to the Storting for the period 2017–2021, and was a member of the Standing Committee on Health and Care Services during the whole period, as well of the Election Committee and the Credentials Committee. She was again re-elected to the Storting for the period 2021–2025.

Minister of Health and Care Services
Kjerkol was appointed minister of health and care services in Støre's Cabinet on 14 October 2021.

Following the attack in Kongsberg, Kjerkol expressed that the health services weren't good enough when faced to handle sick people who may be dangerous. She also mentioned she had brought up with the minister of justice on how the cooperation between the police and health services are like.

On the issue of eating disorders, Kjerkol announced that a plan to assist people with said issues and further mental health would be necessary. She also said it was necessary to increase the special health service and municipalities' services regarding eating disorders.

On 18 December, Kjerkol and higher education minister Ola Borten Moe announced the government’s plan to open 500 new study places for nurses, which would happen by autumn 2022. Kjerkol said: "We lack quite a few sick owners both in the municipalities and in the hospitals.  And then we lack specialist nurses.  Here we are talking about several thousand nurses we would like to have in service". The move was notably praised by both the Conservative and Progress parties.

In April, Kjerkol didn't rule out that discrimination could happen in the health service when it came to gynaecology treatment of women in comparison to men. She also referred to a committee that had been established to find out if deceases that affect women are being treated differently then those that affect men.

In May, Kjerkol asked for inputs for an abortion issue commission that had been set down to look into the largest changes made to the abortion law. The inputs in question were primarily who should sit on the commission, with experiences in different fields regarding abortion.

In the wake of revelations by Aftenposten showing that mentally ill children wasn’t receiving necessary care and treatment by children's welfare services, Kjerkol stated that said children would be prioritised and have an equal right to treatment. She also urged the regions to prioritise children and youth, while it also being important for health services to be able to reach children, including those in institutions.

In August, when revelations emerged that Støre had seen a private doctor, Kjerkol refused to comment. The Red Party went out against this and called it troubling that the government vowed to focus on public health services while the prime minister himself utilised private services.

In September, she stated that hotline and health services should be improved in order to help young people who is leaning towards suicide. She also called for a "build down" on taboos and stigmas and openness around people who lean towards suicide. Kjerkol stated: "It is important to counteract stigma and taboos, so that more people dare to be open about what is difficult.  The men's role comission will look at how boys grow up, also when it comes to the situation of queers who struggle to stand out and experience an additional burden to be themselves".

Back in July 2022, Ukraine had asked Norway to take in injured soldiers. The process was described as being slow and bureaucratic, and only in September was the request accepted. However during the request's evaluation, the process of taking in injured soldiers were temporarily halted. On 11 October, Kjerkol confirmed that the Ministry of Health and Care Services had taken long time to consider Ukraine's demand. She stated: "We wanted to consider this requirement before more offers were made to patients whom Ukraine designated as wounded soldiers. We responded to the Ukrainian authorities in mid-September, when we had decided that there was no need for a separate arrangement for Ukrainian medevac soldiers (medical evacuation, ed. note) in the municipal health and care service. Thus, there was a period when no offer was made to treat soldiers". She also assured that the Ministry's routines would be looked over in order to treat requests faster in the future.

Kjerkol faced criticism from her own party and government partner, the Centre Party, for the government's proposal of cutting investment grants to build new care homes for elderly people and people with development disabilities. Kjerkol emphasised that they would not stop with construction, but that the government instead had prioritised general practitioners (GP), hospitals and mental health in the 2023 budget.

On 1 December, Kjerkol ruled out looking further into whether or not ritual circumcision of boys is in violation of human rights, which had been brought up by the Norwegian Red Cross.

In January 2023, Kjerkol announced that a panel for patients would be established and consist of nine members of different genders and age demographics. The panel, according to her, was established with the aim of improving the participation patients have in the ministry's work.

COVID-19 pandemic in Norway
On 28 October, Kjerkol announced that national restrictions against COVID-19 would not be implemented, further saying that local restrictions and guidelines were sufficient for the time being. Later that day, at a press conference with Camilla Stoltenberg and Espen Rostrup Nakstad, Kjerkol said that if the situation deteriorates, the government will use all the tools necessary. She also mentioned that the government is specifically monitoring hospitalisations and the pressure on the health service carefully. Kjerkol further mentioned that notable restrictions that would be continued, were travel restrictions to limit import infection, and the current TISK (testing, isolation, infection tracing and quarantine) scheme. She reiterated that local health authorities should follow the situation closely and initiate restrictions if there should be cause for concern.

On 4 November, Kjerkol reiterated that the municipalities should take rapid action against COVID-19 should it occur locally. She also announced that nurses who work closely with patients, will be offered a third vaccine dosage. Kjerkol said this decision was made due to it being important to protect the frontline. Regarding temporary transfer of health personal from Eastern Norway to Northern Norway, Kjerkol said this could be expanded to include other health personal groups, but it would be pending on the local situation or increased knowledge of their respective fields.

On 10 November, Kjerkol said that measures such as COVID-19 passport, increased testing and travel entry measures were being considered. She also stated that health authorities were considering other measures as well as the situation progresses.

On 29 November, Kjerkol and the government announced measures against the SARS-CoV-2 Omicron variant. These measures included: isolation period extended to seven days, and ten days quarantine for members of a household and close contacts. Kjerkol also stated that the variant gave reason for higher vaccination rate and that vaccination had to be prioritised.

On 7 December, as the government presented new COVID-19 measures, Kjerkol stated the measures notably were to stop the spread of omicron, saying: "The measures introduced will slow down the spread of omicrons. We do not know now whether the omicron variant will increase admissions further. But the measures will give us time to gain more knowledge about the omicron variant's infectivity and severity, and to vaccinate more".

On 13 December, at a press conference with Jonas Gahr Støre and Tonje Brenna, Kjerkol announced that the Norwegian Army had been asked to assist with vaccination in municipalities who required it. She went on to say: "It is especially important that everyone over the age of 65 and people at high risk of serious illness are vaccinated with a refresher dose as soon as possible, within the set vaccination interval. We must also try to reach as many people as possible who have not previously been fully vaccinated. The interval between dose two and the refresher dose has today been changed to 4.5 months for everyone who is recommended a refresher dose". She also stressed that it was important for municipalities and hospitals to vaccinate their own personnel at a higher rate.

At a press conference on 21 December, Kjerkol was open to reintroduce the COVID-19 certificate sometime after Christmas, but also to more extensive usage. She also said that legislation for this would be put out on consultation in January.

In early January 2022, the Progress Party's spokesperson for health policy, Bård Hoksrud, criticised the government for not allowing municipalities to allow veterinarians, pharmacies and other private operators to assist with vaccinations. Kjerkol responded saying that the government had allowed pharmacies to vaccinate, in addition to health forces from the Norwegian Army. She did however point out that veterinarians didn't have the license to put vaccines in humans.

On 13 January, the government made a few adjustments to existing measures while also lifting a few. Kjerkol announced that tracing now should be done individually, and close contacts need to notify each other if one tests positive. She also vowed that they will protect the health service and keep the pandemic under control. When asked why the municipalities should be allowed to decide the level of measures in schools, but not how long they should serve alcohol, Kjerkol responded: "We want to create limited mobility and contact between adults, through a nationally regulated serving time. This is based on infection control, and part of a package of measures that overall gives us less mobility and less contact".

On 18 November, Kjerkol announced that 18 to 64-year-olds would be offered a refresher vaccine dose.

Elderly care controversy
NRK revealed in January 2023 how many elders were not treated properly at home at a regular basis, furthermore how care workers in care homes had to exceed their work hours to compensate for staff shortages. In response, Kjerkol called for people to take greater care of their own aging process and for municipalities to get a better grasp of elderly care. Despite this, she faced public criticism for her inaction on the issue, also from the opposition and celebrities like Lise Fjeldstad. Former party official Svein Fjellheim called on Kjerkol to resign, and received support from former Oslo city commissioner Gro Balas.

References

1975 births
Living people
People from Stjørdal
Norwegian University of Science and Technology alumni
Labour Party (Norway) politicians
Members of the Storting
Women members of the Storting
Politicians from Nord-Trøndelag
21st-century Norwegian politicians
Ministers of Health and Care Services of Norway